Fresne may refer to:

Communes in France
Fresne, Le Fresneand Fresné is the name or part of the name of several communes in France:

Le Fresne, Eure, in the Eure département 
Le Fresne, Marne, in the Marne département 
Le Fresne-Camilly, in the Calvados département 
Le Fresne-Poret, in the Manche département
Le Fresne-sur-Loire, in the Loire-Atlantique département 
Fresne-Cauverville, in the Eure département 
Fresne-l'Archevêque, in the Eure département 
Fresne-Léguillon, in the Oise département 
Fresne-le-Plan, in the Seine-Maritime département 
Fresne-lès-Reims, in the Marne département 
Fresne-Saint-Mamès, in the Haute-Saône département
Fresné-la-Mère, in the Calvados département

Other
Le Fresne (lai), one of the Lais of Marie de France

See also
Fresnes (disambiguation)
du Fresne
de Fresne (disambiguation)